The Church of the Nazarene Foundation (also referred to as the Nazarene Foundation) is the denominational foundation for the Church of the Nazarene.

External links
 Official Website

Church of the Nazarene
Foundations based in the United States